Eton Excelsior Rowing Club is a rowing club, on the River Thames in England. It is on the Berkshire bank of the Thames at Bray, Berkshire, on the reach above Boveney Lock. The club was founded as an intermittent club in 1821 and formally established in 1851.

The club is the nearest club to the residents of Bray, Windsor, Slough and Eton and is an open rowing club for men, women, adults, juniors and veterans. It is affiliated to British Rowing. The club's colours are navy, amber and white. The club hosts an annual "clubs and pubs regatta".

Boathouse
The club’s original boat house was in King Stable Street in Eton, Berkshire, close to Windsor Bridge. The site was leased from Eton College for 150 years but in the mid-1990s, the College decided to build on the site and the club had to find a new home. For five years the club rented rack space from Eton College at Andrew’s Boat House (also used by the Army) just upstream from Boveney Lock.  The club eventually  found the present site which was split with Wraysbury Skiff and Punting Club who were also looking for a new site at the time. Wraysbury were able to stay at their existing site and withdrew. Construction was completed in 2001 and Eton Excelsior moved in during September of that year.

History
Members of the club was responsible for forming the Windsor Boys' School Boat Club in order to continue rowing through World War II.

Honours

Henley Royal Regatta

British champions

See also
Rowing on the River Thames

References

External links
 Eton Excelsior Rowing Club official website

1821 establishments in England
Rowing clubs of the River Thames
Rowing in Berkshire